This article lists the confirmed national futsal squads for the 1999 UEFA Futsal Championship tournament held in Spain.

External links
UEFA.com

UEFA Futsal Championship squads
Squads